Einstein Gargoyle, also referred to as Albert Einstein, Einstein, and Einstein Gargoyles, is an outdoor 1986 sculpture by Wayne Chabre, installed on the exterior of Willamette Hall on the University of Oregon campus in Eugene, Oregon, United States. The portrait bust depicts Albert Einstein in high relief with a fluttering necktie, and was inspired by a photograph of the scientist on his birthday. It is made of hammered copper sheet and measures approximately  x  x . The sculpture's condition was undetermined when it was surveyed by the Smithsonian Institution's "Save Outdoor Sculpture!" program in March 1993. The sculpture is administered by the University of Oregon.

See also

 1986 in art
 Albert Einstein in popular culture

References

External links

 Einstein Gargoyle at the Public Art Archive
 Einstein Gargoyle – Eugene, Oregon at Waymarking

1986 establishments in Oregon
1986 sculptures
Busts in Oregon
Copper sculptures in Oregon
Cultural depictions of Albert Einstein
Grotesques
Monuments and memorials in Eugene, Oregon
Outdoor sculptures in Eugene, Oregon
Sculptures by Wayne Chabre
Sculptures of men in Oregon
University of Oregon campus